Carlos Alberto Monteiro Dias da Graça (22 December 1931 – 17 April 2013) served as the 6th Prime Minister of São Tomé and Príncipe.

Biography
Graça was one of the co-founders of the Movement for the Liberation of São Tomé and Príncipe (MLSTP). After 25 April 1974 revolution in Portugal he was a member of the transition government preparing the independence of São Tomé and Príncipe. After the independence in 1975 he became Minister of Social Affairs. He was the first founder of the MLSTP raising his opposition to the move of the regime towards a dictatorial Marxist–Leninist regime. For this reason he was sentenced 24 years jail and had to exile again in 1977, becoming one of the main opponents to Manuel Pinto da Costa regime. He was asked by Pinto da Costa to come back to Sao Tome in 1987, in order to prepare the transition to a multi-party democracy. He served as Minister of Foreign Affairs from 1988 to 1990, while being one of the main politicians preparing the new democratic constitution and the first free elections. After the first free elections he became leader of the MLSTP which he turned into Movement for the Liberation of São Tomé and Príncipe (MLSTP/PSD). He led his party to winning the general elections in October 1994 and became Prime Minister.He held the post from 25 October 1994 to 15 August 1995. A short lived military coup d'état temporarily deposed the elected government from 15 August 1995 to 21 August 1995. Civilian rule was restored on 21 August 1995 and Graça remained Prime Minister until 31 December 1995. He is considered as one of the main architects of the democracy in his country. Graça was elected Chairman of the Committee on Social Affairs and at the end of the term in 2006 he moved away from the political party active life.

Death
He died on 17 April 2013 in Lisbon at the age of 81.

Works
He published some works such as: 
Essay on the Human condition in 2004, Edited by IDD - Institute for Democracy and Development
John Paul II Politico, his role in the fall of communism in 2006, Edited by UNEAS-National Union of Writers and Artists STP ;in 2007
Che Guevara: mythical character, Issue IDD, and Autobiography
Political Memoirs of a Nationalist Sui Generis Santomense, Edition UNEAS, 2012

References

1931 births
2013 deaths
People from São Tomé
Foreign Ministers of São Tomé and Príncipe
São Tomé and Príncipe writers
Movement for the Liberation of São Tomé and Príncipe/Social Democratic Party politicians
20th-century São Tomé and Príncipe politicians
21st-century São Tomé and Príncipe politicians